Charles Valencia (1 January 1880 – 17 January 1959) was a Jamaican cricketer. He played in three first-class matches for the Jamaican cricket team in 1901/02.

See also
 List of Jamaican representative cricketers

References

External links
 

1880 births
1959 deaths
Jamaican cricketers
Jamaica cricketers
Sportspeople from Kingston, Jamaica